Special Field Orders No. 64 (series 1864) were military orders issued during the American Civil War, on September 4, 1864, by General William Tecumseh Sherman, commander of the Military Division of the Mississippi of the United States Army, and was issued during the Atlanta Campaign after learning that the Confederate forces commanded by Lieut. Gen. John B. Hood had evacuated Atlanta on Sept. 1, 1864.

This order signaled the end of the Atlanta Campaign that began with the Battle of Rocky Face Ridge fought May 7–13, 1864, north of Dalton, Georgia. This order detailed the occupation of Atlanta and the country near the city. The Army of the Cumberland was to occupy Atlanta. The Army of the Tennessee was to occupy East Point and the head of Camp Creek. The Army of the Ohio was to occupy Decatur. General Sherman announced to his troops:

By Sept. 8, Gen. Sherman reported to Maj. Gen. H. W. Halleck that his “whole Army” was encamped around Atlanta. Gen. Sherman promised his troops rest and pay. Thus began the occupation of Atlanta. During their stay in Atlanta, the troops would build their own quarters, evacuate most of the civilian population, rest, replace worn out equipment, reorganize, and make preparations for their next campaign. When Sherman’s troops began their March to the Sea on November 15, all assets of military value in Atlanta would be destroyed.

Orders

Subsequent Orders issued
Upon the receipt of Sherman’s Special Field Orders, No. 64, each commander of the three Federal Armies in turn issued Special Field Orders to each of their Cops. The commanders and each Corp. then issued Special Field Orders to their Division Commanders.

Abbreviations used
 AC - Army Corps
 SO # - Special Field Order

Publication in the Official Record
This order is part of the Official Records of the American Civil War. It can be found in Series I — Military Operations, Volume XXXVI, Part V, Page 308. The volume was published in 1891.

See also
 Atlanta Campaign
 Battle of Jonesborough
 Atlanta in the American Civil War

References

Notes

Citations

American Civil War documents

General orders
Georgia (U.S. state) in the American Civil War
1864 documents